George Csanak from the Los Alamos National Laboratory (born 1941) is a Hungarian-born American physicist. He was awarded the status of Fellow in the American Physical Society, after they were nominated by their Division of Atomic, Molecular & Optical Physics in 1995, for development of many-body Green's function techniques of bound-state and scattering properties of atomic and molecular systems; significant contributions to the theoretical foundation and physical interpretation of electron-photon coincidence experiments, and for contributions to the understanding of electron scattering.

As a student, he won a gold medal in the first International Mathematical Olympiad.
He attended and graduated his master degree at the Lajos Kossuth University (Debrecen, Hungary). His Ph.D. degree was accepted in 1971 at the University of Southern California.
He is a researcher at the Los Alamos National Laboratory since 1975.
The number of his scientific publicatons is 171, which have 2418 citations.

References 

Fellows of the American Physical Society
American Physical Society
American physicists